Park Ji-hyo (born Park Ji-soo on February 1, 1997), known mononymously as Jihyo, is a South Korean singer. She is the leader and vocalist of the South Korean girl group Twice, formed by JYP Entertainment in 2015.

Life and career

Early life
Jihyo was born on February 1, 1997, in Guri, Gyeonggi Province, South Korea as Park Ji-soo. Her younger sister, Lee Ha-eum (born Park Ji-young) has been modeling and debuting as a rookie actress.

Pre-debut
JYP Entertainment scouted Jihyo after she placed second in a contest on Junior Naver. She joined the company at the age of eight and trained for ten years, during which she became the face of Innisfree's teen line with boy band Boyfriend and trained with K-pop acts such as Wonder Girls' Sunmi and Hyerim, Bae Suzy, Jo Kwon, and Nichkhun. Jihyo was set to debut in a girl group with now-Twice members Nayeon, Jeongyeon and Sana, although the project was cancelled. Instead, she joined the reality television show Sixteen, a competition to select the founding members of Twice. She legally changed her name to Jihyo before the competition. As one of nine successful participants, she went on to join the newly formed girl group Twice. Jihyo was voted by her bandmates as leader in an anonymous vote.

Debut with Twice and solo activities

In October 2015, Twice officially debuted with the release of their first extended play (EP), The Story Begins. Its lead single "Like Ooh-Ahh" became the first K-pop debut song to reach 100 million views on YouTube.

On March 6, 2022, Jihyo released her first OST titled "Stardust Love Song" for tvN's Twenty-Five Twenty-One. She released her second OST titled "I Fly" for SBS's Today's Webtoon on July 29.

In January 2023, Jihyo was announced as the brand model for South Korean cosmetics brand Milk Touch.

Discography

Collaborations

Soundtrack appearances

Songwriting credits
All song credits are adapted from the Korea Music Copyright Association's database unless stated otherwise.

Filmography

Television shows

Bibliography

Photobooks

Awards and nominations

Notes

References

External links

1997 births
Living people
People from Guri
JYP Entertainment artists
South Korean women pop singers
South Korean female idols
Twice (group) members
21st-century South Korean women singers
K-pop singers
Japanese-language singers of South Korea
English-language singers from South Korea